The Leaks, Covers & Mixtapes Tour is the fifth headlining concert tour by American recording artist JoJo. In between recording material for her fourth studio album. The tour will showcase and support rarely performed material from JoJo's independently released catalogue including her two mixtapes Can't Take That Away From Me (2010) and Agápē (2012), her two EPs, LoveJo (2014) and LoveJo2 (2015), as well as songs JoJo has covered during her career and unreleased material that leaked during the recording sessions for JoJo's third studio album, while still contracted under Blackground Records.

Background
Following her release from Blackground Records in 2014, JoJo had since expressed interest in doing something special to commemorate all the leaked tracks that surfaced online during the recording process of her third studio album. Unfinished demos and recordings begun surfacing online since mid 2009 with some as recent as 2017. The tracks had developed a cult following with JoJo's fan base and were always requested at shows and meet and greets with fans.

On April 28, 2018, JoJo officially announced tour dates for the 'Leaks, Covers and Mixtapes Tour' through all her social media channels. In a statement JoJo expressed her excitement to finally be able to perform these songs live for the first time, "This tour is especially for everyone who rocked with me when my hands were tied and my voice was silenced… thought it’d be mad fun to perform these songs since they were such a massive part of my life and you have always shown such passion for them." The tour kicked off May 29, 2018 in Anaheim and hit cities like Los Angeles, San Francisco, and Minneapolis before continuing across the U.S. for dates in New York, Atlanta, and Austin. Finally, the trek wrapped up on June 26, 2018, in Dallas. Pre-sale tickets were made available on April 25, 2018, through JoJo's official website while general public tickets were released on Friday, April 27, 2018. On May 11, 2018, JoJo officially announced that Malia Civetz would be serving as the opening act for the duration of the tour.

Opening Acts
Malia Civetz
Phony People (select dates)

Set list 
This set list is representative of the performance on May 29, 2018. It is not representative of all concerts for the duration of the show.

"Back Words"
"I Hate Love"
"In The Dark"
"Safe With Me"
"Underneath"
"When Does It Go Away"
"Back2thebeginningagain"
"Take The Canyon"
"Can’t Handle The Truth "
"Thinking Out Loud"
"Billions"
"Paint"
"Wonder Woman"
"Rock The Boat" 
"Houstantlantavegas"
"Marvin’s Room (Can’t Do Better)" 
"Caught Up In The Rapture"
"25 To Life"
"The Other Chick"
"Paper Airplanes"
"Miss My Flight"
"Limbo"
"Obey"
"Demonstrate"
"Boy Without A Heart"

Tour dates

References

External links
 Official Website

2018 concert tours